Most of Florida is in the Eastern Time Zone (UTC−05:00, DST UTC−04:00).

The following parts of the Florida panhandle in northwest Florida are in the Central Time Zone (UTC−06:00, DST UTC−05:00):
 Bay County, 2010 population 168,852
 Calhoun County, 2010 population 14,625
 Escambia County, 2010 population 297,619
 Holmes County, 2010 population 19,927
 Jackson County, 2010 population 49,746
 Okaloosa County 2010 population 180,822
 Santa Rosa County, 2010 population 151,372

 Walton County, 2010 population 55,043
 Washington County, 2010 population 24,935
 Northern part of Gulf County

The 2010 population of all counties that are entirely in the Central Time zone was 995,882 out of a total state population of 18,801,310 at that time, or 5.3% of the total state population.

Daylight saving time is observed throughout the state.

Proposed shift to Daylight Saving Time year-round (Sunshine Protection Act)
In 2018, the Florida Legislature approved, and the governor signed, the "Sunshine Protection Act" (House Bill 1013), which would permanently move Florida to Daylight Saving Time. A related bill, Senate Bill 858, also proposed unifying the time zones of the Panhandle counties to the rest of the state, moving the ten counties that are within the Central Time Zone to the Eastern Time Zone, but this bill was not passed. A change to year-round Daylight Saving Time would require approval from United States Department of Transportation as well as the United States Congress.

tz database
The tz database version  contains two time zones for Florida.

References

Florida
Geography of Florida